Podocarpus borneensis is a species of conifer in the family Podocarpaceae. It native to the island of Borneo, which is divided between Indonesia and Malaysia.

It grows primarily in montane rain forests between 700 and 2,100 meters elevation, often on rocky or exposed ridges where it is a small or stunted tree. It is also found scattered in closed-canopy forests, where it can reach 20 meters or more in height. On the sandstone Merurong Plateau it can be the dominant tree, or mixed with other conifers  (species of Agathis, Dacrydium, Dacrycarpus, Podocarpus, and Phyllocladus) and broadleaved trees and shrubs. It is occasionally found at lower elevations, including in kerangas forests on infertile sand, and at least one peat swamp forest site.

References

borneensis
Least concern plants
Endemic flora of Borneo
Flora of the Borneo montane rain forests
Taxonomy articles created by Polbot
Plants described in 1985
Taxa named by David John de Laubenfels
Flora of the Sundaland heath forests